This is a list of states in the Holy Roman Empire beginning with the letter P:

References

P